The year 1983 in architecture involved some significant architectural events and new buildings.

Buildings and structures

Buildings opened

 April 19 – Teresa Carreño Cultural Complex, Caracas, Venezuela, designed by Tomás Lugo Marcano, Jesús Sandoval and Dietrich Kunckel completed.
 May 1 – Church of the Holy Mother of God (Aleppo), Syria.
 October 15 – The Saddledome in Calgary, Alberta.
 October 21 – The Burrell Collection Building in Glasgow, Scotland, UK, designed by Barry Gasson.

Buildings completed

 The Conoco-Phillips Building in Anchorage, Alaska.
 The Alma-Ata Tower in Almaty, Kazakhstan.
 Western Canadian Place in Calgary, Alberta
 Henningsvær Bridges, Norway.
 Wells Fargo Bank Plaza in Houston, Texas.
 Williams Tower/ Transco Tower in Houston, Texas.
 ARCO Tower in Dallas, Texas.
 The Mellon Bank Center in Philadelphia, Pennsylvania.
 Trump Tower in New York City.
 One Cleveland Center in Cleveland, Ohio.
 Manulife Place in Edmonton, Alberta
 Miami Center in Miami, Florida.
 High Museum of Art in Atlanta, Georgia, designed by Richard Meier,
 Pasilan linkkitorni tower, Helsinki, Finland.
 Slovak Radio Building in Bratislava, designed by Štefan Svetko, Štefan Ďurkovič and Barnabáš Kissling.
 Slovak National Archives in Bratislava, designed by Vladimir Dedeček.
 Sainsbury Building, Worcester College, Oxford, England, designed by Richard MacCormac.
 Forestry department offices (later Daugavkrasti Hotel), Jēkabpils, Latvia, designed by Vanda Baulina.
 Les Espaces d’Abraxas social housing complex, Marne-la-Vallée, France, designed by Ricardo Bofill Taller de Arquitectura.

Awards
 Aga Khan Award for Architecture – Zlatko Ugljen, for Šerefudin's White Mosque, built in Visoko.
 AIA Gold Medal – Nathaniel Alexander Owings.
 Architecture Firm Award – Holabird & Root.
 Pritzker Prize – I. M. Pei.
 RAIA Gold Medal – Gilbert Nic and Ross Chisholm.
 RIBA Royal Gold Medal – Norman Foster.
 Twenty-five Year Award – Price Tower.

Deaths

 January 29 – Piloo Mody, Indian architect and politician (born 1926)
 July 1 – Richard Buckminster Fuller, American architect, systems theorist, author, designer, inventor and futurist (born 1895)
 June 12 – Clemens Holzmeister, Austrian architect and stage designer (born 1886)
 August 18
 Nikolaus Pevsner, German-born historian of art and architecture, author of a series of county guides to English architecture (born 1902)
 Jan Zachwatowicz, Polish architect, architectural historian and restorer (born 1900)
 Giuseppe Samoná, Italian architect (born 1898)

References

 
20th-century architecture